Harold Douglas Ursell (1907–1969) was an English mathematician who is best known for Ursell function.

References

20th-century English mathematicians
1907 births
1969 deaths